Phu Phong Glass Joint Stock Company (CTCP Sản xuất Thương mại Dịch vụ Phú Phong) is a company based in the outskirts of Ho Chi Minh City that makes architectural glass and float glass for use in furniture and construction materials.  Phu Phong's main offices are in Ho Chi Minh City.  Its stock is listed at the Hanoi Securities Trading Center, symbol is PPG.

See also
 List of companies of Vietnam

References

External links
 Phu Phong Glass official page
 Phu Phong Glass' page at Importgenius
 Phu Phong Glass' page at Alacrastore
 Phu Phong Glass' page at Hanoi Securities Trading Center

Companies listed on the Hanoi Stock Exchange
Manufacturing companies based in Ho Chi Minh City
Glassmaking companies
Vietnamese brands